Northern Arc may refer to:

Northern Arc (trade route)
Outer Perimeter, a previously planned expressway in Atlanta